Godreaman Halt railway station served the suburb of Godreaman, in the historical county of Glamorganshire, Wales, from 1906 to 1932 on the Vale of Neath Railway.

History

First site 
Coordinates:
The first site of the station opened to the public on 1 January 1906, although it opened to miners in 1903. It was resited on 2 January 1922.

Second site 
Coordinates:
The second site of the station opened on 2 January 1922. It closed to the public on 22 September 1924and closed to miners in 1932.

References 

Disused railway stations in Rhondda Cynon Taf
Former Great Western Railway stations
Railway stations in Great Britain opened in 1906
Railway stations in Great Britain closed in 1924
1903 establishments in Wales
1932 disestablishments in Wales